Samui International Airport , also known as Ko Samui Airport or Koh Samui Airport, is a privately owned airport on the island of Ko Samui (Koh Samui) in Thailand.  The airport is roughly 2 km north of the main city and largest resort centre on the island, Chaweng. It was built by Bangkok Airways. Construction began in 1982 and the airport was officially opened in April 1989.

Samui Airport has a unique, open-air design with the indoor areas being the gift shop, ticket office, toilets, and VIP lounge area.  It is also the country's seventh busiest airport, handling more than a million passengers annually. The airport has two terminals (domestic and international).  The international terminal is about 50 metres north of the domestic terminal. Samui Airport is near the Big Buddha Pier where ferries depart to Ko Pha-ngan.  High speed ferries to Ko Tao and Chumphon depart from the Maenam Beach Pier, approximately 6 km northwest of the airport.

Airline and destinations

Statistics

Accidents and incidents
On 21 November 1990, Bangkok Airways Flight 125, a Bombardier Dash 8, crashed while attempting to land in heavy rain and high winds. All 38 people on board were killed.
On 4 August 2009, Bangkok Airways Flight 266, an ATR 72 between Krabi and Ko Samui skidded off the runway, killing one of the pilots.

References

External links

 Samui Airport (bangkokair.com)
 Official Website

Airports in Thailand
Surat Thani province
Airports established in 1989
1989 establishments in Thailand
Privately owned airports